Chrysis inaequalis is a species of cuckoo wasps (insects in the family Chrysididae). The species occurs in Central and Southern Europe and in the Near East. The head and the thorax are shiny metallic blue-green, while the abdomen is red.

Biology
This species is a parasite of bees and wasps. Main hosts are Osmia, Eumenes and Odynerus species. The adults feed on sweet foods such as nectar, honeydew or various exudates.

Subspecies
Chrysis inaequalis var. cypernensis  Linsenmaier, 1987 
Chrysis inaequalis var. inaequalis  Dahlbom, 1845 
Chrysis inaequalis var. sapphirina  Semenov, 1912

References

 Agnoli G. L. & Rosa P., 2011: Chrysis inaequalis Dahlbom, 1845. Chrysis.net Database of the Italian Chrysididae
 Biolib

Chrysidinae
Insects described in 1845
Hymenoptera of Europe
Taxa named by Anders Gustaf Dahlbom